Quercetin 3,4'-diglucoside is a flavonol glycoside found in onions (Allium cepa) and in horse chestnut seeds (Aesculus hippocastanum).

References 

Quercetin glycosides
Flavonol glucosides